Belmont is an unincorporated community and census-designated place in Sabine Parish, Louisiana, United States. Its population was 361 as of the 2010 census. The community is located at the junction of Louisiana highways 120 and 175.

Geography

Demographics

References

Unincorporated communities in Sabine Parish, Louisiana
Unincorporated communities in Louisiana
Census-designated places in Sabine Parish, Louisiana
Census-designated places in Louisiana